Werner Sauter Wildlife Refuge, is a protected area in Costa Rica, managed under the Tempisque Conservation Area, it was created in 1995 by executive decree 24345-MIRENEM.

References 

Nature reserves in Costa Rica
Protected areas established in 1995